Parliamentary elections were held in Montenegro on 20 October 2002. The result was a victory for the For a European Montenegro alliance formed by the Democratic Party of Socialists (DPS) and the Social Democratic Party (SDP), which won 39 of the 75 seats. It was the last parliamentary election held in Montenegro prior to independence referendum in 2006.

Electoral system
Of the 75 seats in Parliament, 73 were elected by proportional representation in a nationwide constituency and two were elected in a special constituency for the Albanian minority. The electoral threshold was set at 3% and seats allocated using the d'Hondt method. Closed lists were used with a single list for both constituencies, although parties only had to award half their seats according to the order of the list, with the remaining half free for them to allocate.

Contesting parties

Results

References

Elections in Montenegro
Montenegro
Parliamentary
Elections in Serbia and Montenegro
Montenegro